Marcia B. McCabe is an American actress. She played the role of Sunny Adamson in the daytime television drama Search for Tomorrow from 1978 to 1986.

Early life and education
Marcia McCabe was born in Pennsylvania, the granddaughter of Scott Paper Company chairman Thomas B. McCabe and of Parade Publications publisher Arthur H. Motley. She graduated from Abbot Academy in 1973 and attended Rollins College before moving to New York City.

Career
McCabe began her acting career in 1989, portraying publishing executive Alicia Grande in One Life to Live. She has guest starred in Another World, As the World Turns, and All My Children and appeared as herself on the Bob Braun Show, the Match Game Hollywood Squares Hour and the television program entitled Go.

Awards and recognition
In 2021, she was honored by Phillips Academy for developing regional programming including Meals on Wheels and for her dedication and positive attitude in numerous other Non sibi projects.

Personal life
McCabe married fellow actor and director Christopher Goutman in Pennsylvania in 1985. She is currently dating Roland Schulz.

Filmography

References

External links
 Interview with Nelson Aspen (YouTube)
 McCabe on the cover of Soap Opera Digest in 1980
 Scene from 'One Life to Live' (YouTube)

1955 births
Abbot Academy alumni
American soap opera actresses
Female models from New York (state)
Female models from Pennsylvania
Living people
People from New York City
Rollins College alumni
21st-century American women